Sport Lisboa e Benfica, commonly known as Benfica, is a semi-professional table tennis team based in Lisbon, Portugal. Founded in 1935, Benfica play in both the men's and women's national leagues.

It play homes games at the Estádio da Luz in a 190 m² room equipped with modern table tennis tables.

Men's honours

Domestic competitions
 Portuguese Men's Table Tennis League
 Winners (24): 1945, 1948, 1949, 1950, 1951, 1953, 1954, 1958, 1959, 1960, 1962, 1963, 1964, 1965, 1968, 1969, 1971, 1972, 1973, 1974, 1975, 1982, 1983, 1984

 Portuguese Men's Table Tennis Cup
 Winners (16): 1951, 1953, 1954, 1955, 1959, 1961, 1962, 1963, 1964, 1965, 1970, 1971, 1972, 1973, 1974, 1983

Women's honours

Domestic competitions
 Portuguese Women's Table Tennis League
 Winners (11): 1951, 1952, 1953, 1954, 1956, 1961, 1962, 1964, 1965, 1966, 1974

 Portuguese Women's Table Tennis Cup
 Winners (2): 1970, 1973

Technical staff and management

Current roster

Notable international athletes
 Oliveira Ramos (1935–61)
 Francisco Campas (1936–1960)
 Júlio Costa (1941–1970)
 Carlos Galiano (1945–1971)
 Manuela Jesus (1950–1955)
 José Louro (1951–1981)
 Manuel Carvalho (1951–1969)
 Ana Maria Batista (1951–1965)
 Teresa Montoya (1953–1962)
 Alberto Ló (1958–1963)
 Delfim Soares (1959–1966)
 João Rui (1961–1981)
 José Kong (1963–1966)
 José Alvoeiro (1965–2004)
 Óscar Lameira (1966–1969)
 Ana Maria Cruz (1970–1971)
 José Janeiro (1974–1982)
 José Rocha (1974–1978)
 Rogério Alfar (1987–1992)

References

External links
   

 
Table tennis
Table tennis clubs
Sport in Lisbon
1935 establishments in Portugal
Table tennis in Portugal